Simon Green (born 1983) is an English male lawn bowler.

Bowls career
Green became the English champion when he won the singles tournament during the 2016 National Championships.

He bowls for Sandwich Bowling Club.

References

Living people
English male bowls players
1983 births